The solar eclipse of August 11, 2018 was a partial solar eclipse that was visible in the north of North America, Greenland, Northern Europe and north-eastern Asia.

Visibility 

The maximal phase of the partial eclipse was recorded in the East Siberian Sea, near Wrangel Island.

The eclipse was observed in Canada, Greenland, Scotland, most of the Nordic countries (Iceland, Norway, Sweden, Finland), Estonia, Latvia, practically throughout Russia (except for places southwest of the line roughly passing through Pskov, Moscow and Penza, and the most eastern places of the Far East), in Kazakhstan, Kyrgyzstan, Mongolia and China. During sunset, the eclipse was observed in North and South Korea.

Gallery

Related eclipses

Eclipses of 2018 
 A total lunar eclipse on January 31.
 A partial solar eclipse on February 15.
 A partial solar eclipse on July 13.
 A total lunar eclipse on July 27.
 A partial solar eclipse on August 11.

Solar eclipses ascending node 2015-2018 

 Saros 125: Partial Solar Eclipse September 13, 2015
 Saros 135: Annular Solar Eclipse September 1, 2016
 Saros 145: Total Solar Eclipse August 21, 2017
 Saros 155: Partial Solar Eclipse August 11, 2018

Solar eclipses 2015–2018

Saros 155 series

Metonic series

External links 

 

2018 in science
2018 8 11
August 2018 events
2018 8 11